Indirective may refer to:

 Indirective language, a language lacking evidentiality
 Indirective language, a type of ditransitive alignment